Sasha Selvaraj, better known by her stage name Ranjini, is a Singapore born actress known for her roles in Tamil, Malayalam films. She also did few Telugu films. She was the leading actress from 1985 to 1992.

Ranjini made her debut in the 1985 Tamil film Muthal Mariyathai directed by Bharathiraja. In 1987, she acted in Lenin Rajendran's Swathi Thirunal, a biopic on the Travancore ruler of the same name. Her third Malayalam film Chithram (1988), written and directed by  Priyadarshan, went on to become a huge box office success which is still holding the records for numerous feats in the Malayalam movie industry.

Mohanlal-Ranjini was considered a golden duo in Malayalam cinema as all their films were commercial successes. Koothara, directed by Srinath Rajendran, marked her comeback to acting after a hiatus of two decades.

Career
Ranjini was born in Singapore as Sasha to Selvaraj and Lilly, belonging to fourth generation residents of Singapore, with roots from Tirunelveli. She was introduced to films by famous director Bharathiraja, a friend of her father. Bharathiraja gave her the screen name of "Ranjini" for his 1985 film Muthal Mariyathai. Ranjini, whose family was in Singapore then had flown down to Chennai taking a break from studies with the hope that the shooting would get over within two weeks.

Her first Malayalam film was Swathi Thirunal in 1987, a National Award feature directed by Lenin Rajendran. The film was a critical success and she won The Cinema Express Award for Best Actress. She went on to act in Malayalam films like Chithram, Mukunthetta Sumitra Vilikkunnu (1988) and Kottayam Kunjachan (1990).
Ranjini quit acting in films at the peak of her career to move to London, where she continued her studies. Her last film was Customs Diary (1993), directed by TS Suresh Babu.

Ranjini was in the committee of "Nirbhaya-Kochi", an initiative of district administration under Ernakulam District Collector, MG Rajamanickam IAS (The Welfare for Women & Children Safety) in 2014. She was also in the founding committee of "Stree", a project for Women and Health under Maradu municipality in 2016. She regularly appears as a panelist on TV debates for various social topics on National, Malayalam and Tamil Channels. In 2018, she was one of 12 elite panelists invited by The National Commission for Women to a discussion on sexual harassment in the workplace.

Ranjini is known for her voice against The Supreme Court verdict on women-entry at Sabarimala.She was also instrumental in stopping TV counselling shows i.e. Nijangal & Solvathellam Unmai.

Personal life
She married Malayali businessman Pierre Kombara. 
In London, she also did a degree in credit management and later acquired a law degree. She also worked for the BBC for a short time. She is a graduate lawyer and is currently working as a joint director in an overseas education institution in Kochi, Kerala.

Ranjini is also an avid wildlife and environmental activist.

Filmography

Television

Beauty Pageants as  Judge 
Miss India/Kerala 2010 (Miss World-Femina) 
Miss South India  2012 (Miss Asia-Manappuram)
Mrs. Malayali  2019

Tamil films

Malayalam films

Telugu

References

External links

Indian film actresses
Actresses in Malayalam cinema
People from Singapore
Living people
Year of birth missing (living people)
Actresses in Tamil cinema
Actresses in Malayalam television
Actresses in Telugu cinema
Actresses in Tamil television